The Dream Academy is the debut studio album by English band The Dream Academy, released in November 1985. It was produced by Pink Floyd guitarist David Gilmour and Nick Laird-Clowes. "Life in a Northern Town", written as a tribute to the  musician Nick Drake, became the Dream Academy's only major chart success, reaching number 7 on the US Billboard Hot 100 and number 15 in the UK.

The follow-up single from the album, "The Love Parade", was not received as well as their debut single, reaching number 36 on the Billboard Hot 100 chart and only number 68 on the UK chart, but still received solid radio airplay.

Also of note is the song "The Edge of Forever", which plays in a prominent scene during the John Hughes film Ferris Bueller's Day Off, resulting in many fans of 1980s films becoming more familiar with the Dream Academy's music.

The Dream Academy went on to chart at number twenty on the US Billboard 200 in the US.

Track listing

Charts

Miscellanea
"This World" was written about Nick's concerns about his friends becoming junkies.
"Life in a Northern Town" and "The Love Parade" have two different video versions.
"The Party" contains parts of "Life in a Northern Town" and "The Edge of Forever" at the end of the song.
Warners released a 4 video compilation from this album, including videos for "Life in a Northern Town" (2nd version), "The Love Parade" (U.S. radio version), "This World" (filmed in New York City), and "Please, Please, Please Let Me Get What I Want".
VH-1 featured the video for the song in an episode of Pop Up Video in 1999.
"Life in a Northern Town" was featured in an episode of King of the Hill.

Personnel
The Dream Academy
Gilbert Gabriel - keyboards, vocals
Nick Laird-Clowes - guitars, harmonica, vocals
Kate St. John - piano, tenor saxophone, oboe, cor anglais, accordion, piano-accordion

Additional personnel
Gary Barnacle - tenor saxophone
Dave DeFries - trumpet
Peter Buck - guitar on "The Party"
David Gilmour - guitars on "Bound to Be" & "The Party"
Greg Dechert - Hammond organ
Mickey Feat, Pino Palladino, Guy Pratt - bass
Chucho Merchan - double bass
Tony Beard, Bosco DeOliveira, Luís Jardim, Ben Hoffnung, Jake LeMesurier, Dave Mattacks - drums, various percussion

References

1985 debut albums
The Dream Academy albums
Albums produced by David Gilmour
Albums produced by Alan Tarney
Blanco y Negro Records albums
Warner Records albums